Plura is a river in the municipality of Rana in Nordland county, Norway. The river is rich with salmon, trout, and Arctic char. The name comes from the Norwegian verb "prula" which means "boiling" or "seething".

Until 1964, Plura was a large river, washing limestone out of the mountain, creating several caves/tunnels down through the Plurdalen valley. The Kallvatnet dam made the river Plura almost dry, and the water in Pluragrotta cave became standing still like in a water seal.

Media gallery

See also
List of rivers in Norway

References

Rana, Norway
Rivers of Nordland
Rivers of Norway